The 10th National Television Awards ceremony was held at the Royal Albert Hall on 26 October 2004 and was hosted by Sir Trevor McDonald.

Awards

References

National Television Awards
National Television Awards
National Television Awards
2004 in London
National Television Awards
National Television Awards